María Luisa Fernández (born 1 April 1969) is a Spanish butterfly swimmer who competed in the 1988 Summer Olympics and in the 1992 Summer Olympics.

References

1969 births
Living people
Spanish female butterfly swimmers
Olympic swimmers of Spain
Swimmers at the 1988 Summer Olympics
Swimmers at the 1992 Summer Olympics
Mediterranean Games bronze medalists for Spain
Mediterranean Games medalists in swimming
Swimmers at the 1991 Mediterranean Games
20th-century Spanish women